Stacey Copeland (born 19 August 1981) is an English professional boxer and former football player who has held the Commonwealth female super-welterweight title since 2018. As an amateur she won a silver medal at the 2014 European Championships. Copeland also teaches PE to female students at Parrs Wood High School.

Boxing career
Copeland made her professional debut on 16 June 2017, scoring a four-round points decision (PTS) victory Borislava Goranova at the Bowlers Exhibition Centre in Manchester, England.

After compiling a record of 4–0 (2 KOs), she faced Mapule Ngubane for the inaugural Commonwealth female super-welterweight title on 13 July 2018 at the International Convention Centre in Harare, Zimbabwe. Copeland defeated Ngubane via unanimous decision (UD) over ten rounds with scores of 98–91, 98–93 and 97–92. With the win, Copeland became the first British female boxer to win a Commonwealth title.

Professional boxing record

References

1981 births
Living people
Boxers from Greater London
Footballers from Greater London
English women boxers
Light-middleweight boxers
Commonwealth Boxing Council champions
England women's youth international footballers
FA Women's National League players
Tranmere Rovers L.F.C. players
Women's association football forwards
Expatriate women's footballers in Sweden
St. Edward's University alumni
Stockport County L.F.C. players
English women's footballers
Lander Bearcats women's soccer players